The List of Nippon Professional Baseball  champions.

Winners

Japanese Baseball League (1937–1949)

Nippon Professional Baseball (1950–present)

References
General

See also
 List of top Nippon Professional Baseball strikeout pitchers
Nippon Professional Baseball#Awards
Baseball awards#Japan

Nippon Professional Baseball trophies and awards